The Illinois Fighting Illini men's gymnastics team represents the University of Illinois at Urbana–Champaign and competes in the Big Ten Conference. The Fighting Illini have been invited to 47 NCAA tournaments and have won 10 team NCAA championships, which is second most all-time only to Penn State Nittany Lions' 12 team titles. Additionally, the Fighting Illini have won an all-time record 53 individual NCAA titles.

The Illini hold their competitions at George Huff Hall on the Champaign side of campus, and the team trains and holds practices at the Kenney Gym on the Urbana side of campus.

History

Coaching history

 No competition from 1943 to 1946 due to World War II.

All-time record against current NCAA teams

Players

NCAA individual event champions
Illinois has had gymnasts win a record 53 NCAA individual championships.

 1938: Joseph Giallombardo – All-Around
 1938: Joseph Giallombardo – Tumbling
 1938: Joseph Giallombardo – Flying Rings
 1939: Joseph Giallombardo – All-Around
 1939: Joseph Giallombardo – Tumbling
 1939: Marvin Forman – Long Horse
 1940: Paul Fina – All-Around
 1940: Harry Koehnemann – Side Horse
 1940: Joseph Giallombardo – Tumbling
 1940: Joseph Giallombardo – All-Around
 1941: Caton Cobb – Side Horse
 1941: Caton Cobb – Parallel Bars
 1941: Jack Adkins – Tumbling

 1942: Caton Cobb – Side Horse
 1948: Gay Hughes – Trampoline
 1948: Joe Calvetti – High Bar
 1950: Irving Bedard – Tumbling
 1952: Frank Bare – Side Horse
 1952: Bob Sullivan – Tumbling
 1953: Bob Sullivan – Floor Exercise
 1954: Dick Browning – Tumbling
 1956: Don Tonry – All-Around
 1956: Dan Lirot – Tumbling
 1957: Frank Hailand – Tumbling
 1957: Abie Grossfeld – High Bar
 1957: John Davis – Side Horse

 1958: Abie Grossfeld – High Bar
 1958: Abie Grossfeld – All-Around
 1958: Abie Grossfeld – Floor Exercise
 1958: Frank Hailand – Tumbling
 1959: Don Tonry – Floor Exercise
 1960: Alvin Barasch – Tumbling
 1960: Ray Hadley – Floor Exercise
 1962: Mike Aufrecht – Side Horse
 1963: Hal Holmes – Tumbling
 1969: John McCarthy – Long Horse
 1980: Dave Stoldt – Pommel Horse
 1984: Charles Lakes – High Bar
 1998: Travis Romagnoli – All-Around

 1998: Travis Romagnoli – Vault
 2004: Bob Rogers – Pommel Horse
 2004: Justin Spring – High Bar
 2005: Justin Spring – Parallel Bars
 2006: Justin Spring – Parallel Bars
 2006: Justin Spring – High Bar
 2008: Paul Ruggeri – High Bar
 2009: Paul Ruggeri – High Bar, Parallel Bars
 2009: Daniel Ribeiro – Pommel Horse
 2011: Tyler Mizoguchi – Parallel Bars
 2011: Daniel Ribeiro – Pommel Horse
 2012: C .J . Maestas – Still Rings
 2012: Paul Ruggeri – Vault
 2013: Fred Hartville – Vault
 2014: Jordan Valdez – High Bar
 2015: C.J. Maestas – High Bar
 2016: Brandon Ngai – Pommel Horse

Nissen Emery Award
The Nissen-Emery Award is annually awarded to the best overall male senior collegiate gymnast in the United States. The award recipient must not only excel athletically as a gymnast, but also must display outstanding sportsmanship and scholarship throughout his college career. The award was created in 1966 and is men's gymnastics' equivalent to college football's Heisman Trophy. 
 1989: David Zeddies
 2006: Justin Spring
 2010: Luke Stannard
 2012: Paul Ruggeri

Nissen Emery Finalists

 1980: Butch Zunich
 1981: Steve Lechner
 1986: Joe Ledvora
 1988: Tigran Mkchyan
 1989: David Zeddies
 1993: Ricardo Cheriel
 1995: Brian Kobylinski

 1998: Jon Corbitt
 1999: Kyle Zak
 2000: Travis Romagnoli
 2001: Leo Oka
 2002: J.G. Ketchen
 2004: Bob Rogers
 2005: Ben Newman

 2006: Justin Spring
 2008: Wes Haagensen
 2010: Luke Stannard
 2011: Danial Ribeiro
 2012: Paul Ruggeri
 2013: Yoshi Mori
 2016: Logan Bradley

Illinois Olympians

 1940 Tokyo: Paul Fina – Olympics cancelled due to World War II
 1956 Melbourne: Abie Grossfeld
 1960 Rome: Abie Grossfeld
 1960 Rome: Don Tonry

 1988 Seoul: Dominick Minicucci
 1988 Seoul: Charles Lakes
 1992 Barcelona:Dominick Minicucci
 2008 Beijing: Justin Spring – Bronze Medal-Artistic Team All-Around

References

External links